The Chʼolan ( Cholan–Tzeltalan languages) are a branch of the Mayan family of Mexico. These languages break into six sections being Cholan and Tzeltalan. Cholan has then two subsections being Western Cholan and Chʼoltiʼan; these composing the two larger sections of slight linguistic differences portrayed by  Kuryłowicz's Fourth Law of Analogy. The language Tzeltalan also breaks up into sections; Tzendal (colonial Tzeltal), Tzotzil, and Wastekan. These subsections differ by similar linguistic differences.

Languages
Cholan (proper): Chʼol–Chontal, Chʼortiʼ–Chʼoltiʼ (likely also Classic Maya)
Tzeltalan: Tzeltal, Tzotzil

See Mayan languages#Western branch for details.

See also
Acala Chʼol
Lakandon Chʼol
Manche Chʼol

References

Ara, Domingo de 1571 Bocabulario en lengua Tzeldal. Gates Collection. Box 64, Folder 7. Harold B. Lee Library. Brigham Young University.
Aulie, H. Wilbur, and Evelyn W. de Aulie, 1978 Diccionario Chʼol: Chʼol–Español, Español–Chʼol. Mexico: SIL.
Barber, Charles 2000 The English language: a Historical Introduction. Cambridge: Cambridge University Press.
Campbell, Lyle, and Terrence Kaufman. 1985 Mayan linguistics: Where are we now? Annual Review of Anthropology 14:187–98.
Coon, Jessica L. 2004 Roots and Words in Chol (Mayan): A Distributed Morphology Approach. BA thesis, Reed College.
Dayley, Jon, P. 1981 Voice and Ergativity in Mayan Languages. Journal of Mayan Linguistics 2(2):3-82.
Edmonson, Barbara 1988 A Descriptive Grammar of Huastec (Potosino Dialect). Department of Anthropology, Tulane University.
Haviland, John B. n.d. Skʼop Sotzʼleb: El Tzotzil de San Lorenzo Zinacantán. http://www.zapata.org/Tzotzil/.
Houston, Stephen D., John S. Robertson, and David S. Stuart 2000 The Language of the Classic Maya Inscriptions. Current Anthropology 41(3):321-338.
Hruby, Zachary X., and Mark B. Child 2004 Chontal Linguistic Influence in Ancient Maya Writing: Intransitive Positional Verbal Affixation." In The Linguistics of Maya Writing, edited by Søren Wichmann, pp. 13–26. Salt Lake City: University of Utah Press.
Mora-Marín, David 2009 A Test and Falsification of the 'Classic Chʼoltiʼan' Hypothesis: A Study of Three Proto Chʼolan Markers. International Journal of American Linguistics 75(2):115-157.
Morán, Francisco 1695 Arte en lengua Cholti que quiere decir lengua de milperos. Gates Collection. Box 42. Harold B. Lee Library. Brigham Young University.
Robertson, John S. 1979 Review of Quichéan linguistic prehistory, by Lyle Campbell. Language 55:936-938.
Robertson, John S.  1983 From symbol to icon: The evolution o the pronominal system of Common Mayan to modern Yucatecan. Language 59:529-540.
Robertson, John S. and Stephen Houston 2003 El problema del Wasteko: Una perspectiva lingüística y arqueológica. In XVI simposio de investigaciones arqueológicas en Guatemala, edited by Juan Pedro Laporte, Bárbara Arroyo, Héctor Escobedo and Héctor Mejía, pp. 723–733. Guatemala: Ministerio de Cultura y Deportes.

Mayan languages